GVB may refer to:
 Gaither Vocal Band, an American gospel group
 Garibaldi Volcanic Belt, in British Columbia, Canada
 Gemeentelijk Vervoerbedrijf, a municipal transport company in Amsterdam
 Generalized valence bond
 Giovanni van Bronckhorst, a Dutch football player
 Girls v. Boys, an American reality television series
 Godzilla vs. Biollante, a 1989 film
 Golf license
 Grapevine virus D, a plant virus
 Grover Beach (Amtrak station), in California, United States